Assorted Nuts Animation Studios, headquartered in Karlstad, Sweden, is an independent animation studio and development/production house that creates animated films and characters. The studio makes animated feature films, TV series and on-demand content for international markets that, in the words of its founder, Magnus Jansson, has subjects 'spanning all age-groups and genres, from pre-school to family entertainment to adult comedy.' 

The studio has an American subsidiary, Assorted Nuts Entertainment, founded in 2012 and located in Santa Monica, Los Angeles.

Founding
The company was founded in 2002 by Magnus Jansson, Erik Öhrner, Emil Cederman and Johan Kirppu while they were still students at Karlstad University, and began operations in 2003.

Studio

Locations
The main headquarters of Assorted Nuts is located in Karlstad. A new arm of Assorted Nuts Animation Studios opened in Santa Monica, Los Angeles in 2012 under the title Assorted Nuts Entertainment  and led by Lee Adams, the former Toonzone Studios Vice President of Marketing.

Filmography

The Goob
The Goob is an animated series featuring adventures of the character Dwayne 'The Goob' Dunderson from rural Alabama in the American Deep South as he travels towards Hollywood and dreams of stardom. The Goob blogs his travels on his camera phone, establishing the series as the world's first to feature a 3D animated blogger.

The Goob earned Magnus Jansson and Assorted Nuts the 2010 Streamy Award for 'Best Animation in a Web-Series'. The animated series also achieved over 5 million mobile downloads and The Goob character was signed by EMI as a recording artist, releasing a dance remix of the Country song "Feel The Free".

The Goob was picked up by the American online network Toon Goggles in September 2012,  and by October it was the network's number 2 rated show. It premiered in the US on Strike.TV.

Monkey Business
'Monkey Business' features the Tom & Jerry-esque slapstick comedy antics of two characters on a jungle island - Ben the seasoned monkey and Al the young gorilla. The series was chosen by Cartoon Forums to be presented at an international fair in Toulouse and had its UK premiere on the BBC's CBBC channel in 2010.

Jumping Green Things
Assorted Nuts entered into a co-production with Tinopolis Ltd to create Jumping Green things, a 90-minute animated feature with the tagline They needed heroes. They got village idiots  Originally scheduled for completion in 2005, the project was previewed at the Cartoon Movie festival of European animation in spring 2003.

My Pink World
An animated comedy about eleven-year-old Tiffany and her relationship with her father, Mike.

Awards

At the 2nd Annual Streamy Awards on Sunday, April 11, 2010, at the Orpheum Theatre in Los Angeles, California, Assorted Nuts's Magnus Jansson was awarded the Streamy Award for 'Best Animation in a Web-Series' by the International Academy of Web Television for the online series The Goob  after the animated series first became a successful mobile download in 2008, achieving over five million mobile downloads in its first year.

References

External links
 Assorted Nuts
 Assorted Nuts blog
 The Goob
 The Goob award speech/interview - 2010 Streamy Awards
 2010 Streamy Awards - Magnus Jansson's Streamy award acceptance speech
 The Goob on Facebook

Swedish animation studios
Mass media companies established in 2002
Entertainment companies established in 2002
Swedish companies established in 2002